New Holland Publishers is an English-based international publisher of non-fiction books, founded in 1955. It is a privately held company, with offices in the United Kingdom, Australia and New Zealand.

History
The publishing firm was established as "Holland Press" was on 20 June 1955 in Southwark, London, England, and renamed to New Holland Publishers in 1988. It currently operates offices in London and Chatswood, New South Wales, Australia. The company went through a significant round of redundancies from 2008–2011. In 2013 the company sold US publishing rights to over 200 titles to Bloomsbury; and in 2014 over 1,400 titles to Fox Chapel Publishing of East Petersburg, Pennsylvania.

References 

Book publishing companies based in London
Companies based in the London Borough of Southwark
Publishing companies established in 1955
1955 establishments in the United Kingdom